James Keith Pritchett (born 1 July 1982 in Watford, England) is an association football player who represented New Zealand as a defender at both age group and senior international level. He is the son of former New Zealand manager Keith Pritchett.

His senior career included one season with the Football Kingz, New Zealand's professional franchise in the Australian NSL He represented Auckland City FC at the 2006 FIFA Club World Cup, where they lost against Al Ahly and Jeonbuk Hyundai.

Pritchett was included in the New Zealand under-17 side for the 1999 FIFA under-17 World Cup hosted by New Zealand, appearing in all three group games. He also represented New Zealand at under-23 level in New Zealand's failed bid to qualify for the 2004 Olympics.

Pritchett went on to make his full All Whites début in a 2–1 win over Malaysia on 23 February 2006 and has six A-international caps to his credit.

References

External links
 James Pritchett Interview

Profile at NZ Football

1982 births
Living people
New Zealand association footballers
New Zealand international footballers
Auckland City FC players
Football Kingz F.C. players
New Zealand Football Championship players
Footballers from Hertfordshire
Sportspeople from Watford
Association football defenders
English emigrants to New Zealand
New Zealand people of Scottish descent
English people of Scottish descent
2008 OFC Nations Cup players